Public transport in Lima is handled by buses, micros, taxicabs, and the so-called mototaxis. Micros are the most common means of public transportation in Lima and many other cities in Peru.

The word micro is used in common-day Peruvian Spanish as an abbreviation for microbus (minibus). While the bigger vehicles are known as micros, the smaller ones are known as either combis or micros. These privately owned vehicles are not only known for being very cheap and convenient but also for being rather risky.

Micros race from one street corner to another along all the major arterial city roads. Stickers saying, for example, "Todo Angamos" or "Todo Benavides" can be seen on their windscreens, which indicates that the micro runs the whole length of Avenida Angamos or Avenida Alfredo Benavides. These microbuses dash dangerously fast, frequently crashing and speeding off before their passengers have got both feet into the vehicle. There being few bus stops, micros and combis pick and drop passengers anywhere along their route (although it is not allowed). Tickets became compulsory in the late-80s. No transfer tickets are issued, so double fares are often used by people when a micro passing through downtown does not go to the destination needed, although with the lack of control of routes nowadays there are many routes that go just about everywhere within the city limits. The only places where micros are no longer allowed to circulate is in the crosstown streets within downtown Lima: if you need to go from the West Side to the East Side you must walk or take a taxi (see below), and micros go north-south only through either the West or East sides' main arteries, Tacna Ave. and Abancay Ave. respectively.

Nowadays, the new Metropolitano bus rapid transit system and the first line of the Lima Metro attempt to modernize the way.

Lima Metro

The Lima Metro is the electric mass transit system of the Lima Metropolitan Area in Peru. It currently consists of one 35 km line and 26 stations, joining the southern area of the metropolis with the center and the north east of the city. Five additional lines are planned.

In 2010 the government of Alan García resumed the project of Lima Metro starting with the construction of Line 1. The construction and implementation of 11.7 kilometres (7.3 mi) (with a total of 22.5 kilometres (14.0 mi)) of viaduct elevated of double ramp from the Atocongo Bridge to downtown Lima. The Lima Metro Line 1 was built by a consortium made up by two engineering and construction companies. The line began commercial operations in early 2012. Nineteen new Alstom trains have arrived since November 2012, adding to the current fleet of five AnsaldoBreda trains, this is major impulse of the service. An extension of 12.4 kilometers is in service since July 2014 to the northern district of San Juan de Lurigancho.

The line 2 is an East-West underground Metro line which is under construction, this contract includes the construction of a segment of line 4, this last line will link the system with the Jorge Chavez International Airport. It is expected to begin partial operation in 2016, and full operation for both lines in 2019.

El Metropolitano

The Metropolitan Transportation System is a transportation system which integrates the Independent Corridor of Mass-Transit Buses known by its Spanish initials as COSAC 1. This system links the principal points of the Lima Metropolitan Area and the first phase of this project has thirty three-kilometer long line from Independencia in the north of the city to Chorrillos in the south of the city. It has 38 stations along 33 km. of busway.  This system is similar to the TransMilenio of Bogota, and inspirated of the previous system that existed on the city the National Urban Transport Company (In Spanish: Empresa Nacional de Transporte Urbano-ENATRU) which was the first urban transport system in Peru, that also even inspired other companies such as the Rede Integrada de Transporte (which started the era of BRT).

Sistema Integrado de Transporte
The Sistema Integrado de Transporte (which means Integrated Transport System), is a bus system developed by the local government to reorganize the current system of routes that has become chaotic. One of the main goals of the SIT is to reduce the number of urban routes, renew the bus fleet currently operating by many private companies and to reduce (and eventually replace) most "combis" from the city.

As of July 2020, SIT currently operates 16 routes: SAN MARTIN DE PORRES – SURCO (107) ATE – SAN MIGUEL (201, 202,204,206 and 209), RIMAC – SURCO (301,302,303 and 306), San Juan de Lurigancho – MAGDALENA (404,405,409,412), and DOWNTOWN LIMA – SAN MIGUEL(508)

Buses

In the 1990s, during the government of the president Alberto Fujimori, it was established that the number of buses were not enough to transport people around the city, and the use of secondhand automobiles (mostly combis) from others countries was permitted.

Since the end of 2000s, many combi were replaced by buses between 9 to 18 meters.

Vehicles
The most popular vehicle types used by the Buses in Lima are Volvo, the brasilians CAIO, Marcopolo, Comil, also buses in brands MODASA, METALBUS, Yutong, KING LONG, and GOLDEN DRAGON.

Routes
Each transport company has its own routes, which usually pass through many districts. Some of the routes in the Lima and Callao Metropolitan Area are:
Ate – Callao (4901,4902,4904,4905,4908,4911,9401,9404,9405)
Carabayllo – Miraflores (Routes 1702,1705 and 1706)
Carabayllo – Pachacámac (Route 1803,8102,8104,8105,8106,8107,8108)
Villa el Salvador – Ventanilla (Route 9801,9802)
San Martin de Porres – Pachacámac (Routes 2803,2804,2805,8201,8203,8205,8209,8211,8212,8213,8214)
San Bartolo – San Miguel (Routes 8510 and 8511)
Santiago de Surco – Ancón (Route 1702,1804)
Villa el Salvador – San Juan de Lurigancho (Routes 8306,3807)
Some older routes,can be defined by their old numbering until the early 1990s. The old route number is usually prominently displayed on the "passenger" side of the front window, as a backward reference. Many modern routes, however, lack this number. Old route numbers still well known (as of 2007) are # 2 (route 9504), 8 (route 3810), 9 (route 8403), 23 (routes 8519; 8520 and 3806), 31 (route 3707), 48 (route 3612), 71 (route 4908), 91 (routes 4405 and 4703), 94 (route 3906).

If one company branches out into many routes (generally overlapping at the center of the route) the different routes may be differentiated by letters: 104A, 104B, 104C, and so on, for instance. 104A (This route isn't available) goes from Penal section of San Juan de Lurigancho to San Miguel via the East Side of downtown; 104B (route 3509) goes from Mangomarca section of SJL (the original terminus) to San Miguel via the East Side; and 104C (This route isn't available) goes from Mangomarca to Miraflores, via the West Side.

Taxis

Taxis in the city are very cheap. There are no meters so you must tell the driver where you want to go and agree on a price before you get in. Since there are no meters, many taxi drivers overcharge inexperienced foreigners with high cab fares.

They vary in sizes from small four door compacts (generally Korean Daewoo Ticos) to large vans capable of transporting many pieces of luggage from the airport to your destination. They are virtually everywhere, accounting for a large part of the car stock. Often they are just any random car with a taxi sticker on the windshield. As in other major cities the way to flag them down is to wave your hand up high. Also much more expensive but more secure and professional are the Taxi Seguro's which you call up. They pick you up in their company cars. There are many different taxi companies in Lima. The most common cars used as taxis in Lima are Kia Rio, Chevrolet Sail, Toyota Yaris and some Toyota and Nissan station wagon models.

In recent years, vehicle for hire mobile apps have become more popular, since they usually provide a more comfortable experience than regular taxis, which are often considered not as safe. Some of the most used taxi apps in Lima are Beat and Uber, and to a lesser extent Cabify and DiDi.

Taxis will take you virtually anywhere in the city. You can tell them to take you to a certain hotel, tourist destination, or mall and they will probably know how to get there. Citizens of Lima commonly joke that they have the most educated taxi drivers in the world. The joke is based on the fact that taxi-running is a major source of income for unemployed or under-employed people, including professionals with a university degree who either rent or own the cars they drive. A whole economy spreads from investments in vehicle acquisition to be later rented as taxi cabs.

Taxis are the most efficient and fastest way of transportation in Lima but in rush hour, however they are also considered somewhat risky since some criminals disguise as taxi drivers and steal from the confident passenger at gunpoint later on. An indication of the security of the Taxi is to check if it has the label of the Setame on the windshield, which stands for Servicio de Taxi Metropolitano, the administrative authority that regulates taxi cabs. Setame taxis are in most cases painted in a distinctive yellow colour. Taxis without the Setame label are considered to be informal and risky. Lately the Setame label does not mean safety anymore, people is choosing modern IOS/Android remisse services to contact a safe option of transport.

Mototaxis and pedicabs are used in peripheral districts such as Puente Piedra and Lurín where there isn't heavy traffic, although with the spread of urbanization and routes they are losing ground to regular micros.

Public transport statistics
The average amount of time people spend commuting with public transit in Lima, for example to and from work, on a weekday is 95 min. 35% of public transit riders, ride for more than 2 hours every day. The average amount of time people wait at a stop or station for public transit is 14 min, while 19% of riders wait for over 20 minutes on average every day. The average distance people usually ride in a single trip with public transit is 8.1 km, while 17% travel for over 12 km in a single direction.

Private cars

In the last two decades car sales has been growing every year, now Lima have approximately 1.4 million cars and industry plans to sell around of 200,000 new vehicles for next years. This way of commute is one of the most frequent, is a result of a growing economy and it shows a better income rate between Lima citizens.

Air transport
Lima is served by the Jorge Chavez International Airport, located in Callao. It is the largest airport of the country with the largest amount of domestic and international air traffic.

It also serves as a major hub in the Latin American air network. Additionally, Lima possesses other airports: the Las Palmas Air Force Base, and in San Bartolo.

Pollution
There are approximately 60,000 cars in Lima. Few richer transportation companies use modern bodies made in Brazil or Argentina. Smaller companies use smaller vehicles such as minibuses and minivans.

Since almost all of these vehicles are poorly maintained, they produce a great amount of pollution. Statistics show that in July 2001, the amount of nitrogen dioxide (NO2) was of 236.66 mg/m3, the maximum allowable quantity being 100 mg/m3 . The presence of small particles of different materials (dust, lead and other metals), was also high during this month: 294.12 mg/m3, while the allowed limit is 150 mg/m3 .

See also
 Lima Metro
 El Metropolitano
 List of metro systems
 List of bus rapid transit systems

References

 
Public transport in Peru
Economy of Lima